James Hepler (born October 15, 1973) is an American musician. Associated with several local North Carolina musical groups, Hepler plays several musical instruments and is most recognized for his drumming, playing with the bands I Was Totally Destroying It and Sorry About Dresden.

Hepler is an advocate, contributor, and representative for Cytunes.org, an organization that features music from artists who have contributed tracks to help raise money in memory of Cy Rawls, a close friend, who died October 3, 2008 from a malignant brain tumor.  All proceeds from CyTunes are donated to the Preston Robert Tisch Brain Tumor Center at Duke University Medical Center, where Rawls was treated.

Hepler graduated from University of North Carolina at Chapel Hill in 1996 with a degree in communications (radio, TV and film) and Durham Technical Community College in 2005 with a degree in electronics. He currently resides in Durham, North Carolina.

Personal life
Hepler has a relationship with the preparation, presentation and eating of food. He is well known in local circles as a pit master and master chef. He has been featured in two separate cook books; Lost in the Supermarket by Kay Bozich Owens & Lynn Owens and I Like Food, Food Tastes Good by Kara Zuaro. He has also been featured in a few cooking blogs.

Discography

Sorry About Dresden
"Sorry About Dresden/The Jagular Drop 7" Split" (2006) – Horn Records
Let it Rest (2003) – Saddle Creek Records
The Convenience of Indecision (2001) – Saddle Creek Records
How the Cold War Began (2001) – Moment Before Impact Records
Rock School (2001) – Moment Before Impact Records
The Mayor Will Abdicate (1999) – Route 14 Records
Saddle Creek 50 (2002 • Saddle Creek)
Lagniappe: A Saddle Creek Benefit for Hurricane Katrina (2005 • Saddle Creek)

I Was Totally Destroying It
I Was Totally Destroying It (2007) – self-released
Done Waiting EP (2008) – self-released
The Beached Margin/Done Waiting LP (2009) – Greyday Records
Horror Vacui (2009) – Greyday Records
Get Big (Limited Edition 7" single) (2010) – Greyday Records

Chamber Corps
''Chamber Corps EP' (self-released, Internet only)

References

External links
 Indyweek IWTDI article
 IWTDI Official website
 IWTDI Page on Greyday Records webpage
 New Raleigh Interview
 sorryaboutdresden.com
 

American male singer-songwriters
Musicians from Durham, North Carolina
Singer-songwriters from North Carolina
1973 births
Living people
Guitarists from North Carolina
American male guitarists
20th-century American drummers
American male drummers
21st-century American singers
21st-century American guitarists
21st-century American drummers
20th-century American male musicians
21st-century American male singers